A Satanic film is a subgenre of horror film, and at times other film genres, that involves the Devil as a concept or a character. Common themes/characters in Satanic film include the Antichrist, demonic possession, exorcism, and witchcraft.

List of Satanic films

pre-1960s

1960s

1970s

1980s

1990s

2000s

2010s

See also
Devil in popular culture
Satanism
Satan
List of horror film antagonists

References

Film genres
Horror films by genre
Satan
Fiction about the Devil
The Devil in film